Port Botany is a suburb in the Eastern Suburbs of Sydney, in the state of New South Wales, Australia. Port Botany is located 12 kilometres south-east of the Sydney central business district, in the local government area of the City of Randwick. Port Botany sits on the northern shore of Botany Bay, adjacent to the suburbs of Matraville, Banksmeadow and Phillip Bay.

History
Botany Bay is where Lieutenant James Cook first landed on 29 April 1770, when navigating his way up the east-coast of Australia on his ship, the Endeavour. The ship's English naturalist Joseph Banks and Swedish botanist Daniel Solander spent several days on shore collecting vast numbers of specimens that were previously unknown. Cook's journals first referred to the bay as Sting Rays' Harbour, then later Botanist Bay and finally both these names were crossed out and replaced with Botany Bay. The suburb name comes from the bay it stands on.

Landmarks
Molineaux Point features views to La Perouse and Kurnell. A cairn and plaque here commemorates the sister ports relationship between Sydney Ports Corporation and Yokkaichi Port Authority, Mie Japan.  The revetment wall is called Banks Wall after Sir Joseph Banks.

Commercial area

Port Botany is a major commercial area that is serviced by road and rail networks, together with Sydney's nearby international and domestic airports. The two Container Terminal facilities are complemented by a bulk liquids facility and an adjacent bulk liquids storage and distribution complex.

References

Botany Bay
Suburbs of Sydney
Botany, New South Wales